Shrutakirti is a princess featured in the Hindu epic Ramayana. She is the daughter of King Kushadhvaja and queen Chandrabhaga. She is the wife of Shatrughna, the younger brother of Rama.

Legend 
Shrutakirti is the Princess of Sāṃkāśya, and the younger daughter of King Kushadhvaja. Shrutakirti's elder sister, Mandavi, is married to Bharata.

Shrutakirti is married to Ayodhya's king Dasharatha's fourth and youngest son, Shatrughna. They have two sons, Subahu and Shatrughati. 

She used to take care of her in-laws, along with her sister Mandavi when her eldest sister Sita along with her brothers-in-law Rama and Lakshmana were exiled, and Urmila slept in the place of her husband. Later, Shrutakirti became the queen of Madhupura (Mathura) when her husband Shatrughna captured the capital after killing Lavanasura.

References

Solar dynasty

Characters_in_the_Ramayana